Semipallium is a genus of bivalves belonging to subfamily Pedinae of the family Pectinidae.

Species
 Semipallium aktinos (Petterd, 1886)
 Semipallium amicum (E. A. Smith, 1885)
 Semipallium barnetti Dijkstra, 1989
 Semipallium crouchi (E. A. Smith, 1892)
 Semipallium dianae (Crandall, 1979)
 Semipallium dringi (Reeve, 1853)
 Semipallium flavicans (Linnaeus, 1758)
 Semipallium fulvicostatum (A. Adams & Reeve, 1850)
 Semipallium hallae (Cotton, 1960)
 Semipallium marybellae Raines, 1996
 Semipallium rapanense (Bavay, 1905)
Synonyms
 Semipallium coruscans (Hinds, 1845): synonym of Pascahinnites coruscans (Hinds, 1845)
 Semipallium jousseaumei: synonym of Chlamys jousseaumei Bavay, 1904: synonym of Veprichlamys jousseaumei (Bavay, 1904)
 Semipallium kengaluorum Dijkstra, 1986: synonym of Semipallium dringi (Reeve, 1853) 
 Semipallium luculentum (Reeve, 1853): synonym of Semipallium fulvicostatum (A. Adams & Reeve, 1850)
 Semipallium natans (Philippi, 1845): synonym of Austrochlamys natans (Philippi, 1845)
 Semipallium radula (Linnaeus, 1758): synonym of Decatopecten radula (Linnaeus, 1758)
 Semipallium tigris (Lamarck, 1819): synonym of Semipallium flavicans (Linnaeus, 1758)
 Semipallium vexillum (Reeve, 1853): synonym of Bractechlamys vexillum (Reeve, 1853)
 Semipallium xishaense Z.-R. Wang, 1985: synonym of Excellichlamys spectabilis (Reeve, 1853)

References

 Rombouts, A. (1991). Guidebook to Pecten shells. Universal Book Services/Backhuys

External links

 Iredale, T. (1929). Mollusca from the continental shelf of eastern Australia. Records of the Australian Museum. 17(4): 157-189
 Dijkstra, H. H. (2013). Pectinoidea (Bivalvia: Propeamussiidae and Pectinidae) from the Panglao region, Philippine Islands. Vita Malacologica. 10: 1-108

Pectinidae
Bivalve genera